Waymo LLC, formerly known as the Google Self-Driving Car Project, is an American autonomous driving technology company headquartered in Mountain View, California. It is a subsidiary of Alphabet Inc., the parent company of Google.

Google's development of self-driving technology began in January 2009, at the company's Google X lab run by co-founder Sergey Brin. The project was launched by Sebastian Thrun, director of the Stanford Artificial Intelligence Laboratory (SAIL) and Anthony Levandowski, founder of 510 Systems and Anthony's Robots. The project was renamed Waymo in December 2016 following a corporate restructuring of Google.

Waymo operates commercial self-driving taxi services in Phoenix, Arizona and San Francisco, CA. In October 2020, the company expanded the service to the public, and it was the only self-driving commercial service that operates without safety backup drivers in the vehicle at that time. Waymo also develops driving technology for use in other vehicles, including delivery vans and Class 8 tractor-trailers for delivery and logistics.

Waymo is run by co-CEOs Tekedra Mawakana and Dmitri Dolgov. The company has raised $5.5 billion in multiple outside funding rounds. Waymo has partnerships with multiple vehicle manufacturers to integrate Waymo's technology, including with Mercedes-Benz Group AG, Nissan-Renault, Stellantis, Jaguar Land Rover, Volvo, and Geely.

History

Ground work 
Google's development of self-driving technology began on January 17, 2009, at the company's secretive Google X lab run by co-founder Sergey Brin. The project was launched by Sebastian Thrun, the former director of the Stanford Artificial Intelligence Laboratory (SAIL) and Anthony Levandowski, founder of 510 Systems and Anthony's Robots.

Before working at Google, Thrun and 15 engineers, including Dmitri Dolgov, Anthony Levandowski, and Mike Montemerlo worked together on a digital mapping technology project for SAIL called VueTool. Many of the team members had met at the 2005 DARPA Grand Challenge where both Thrun and Levandowski had teams competing in the robotic, self-driving car challenge. In 2007, Google acqui-hired the entire VueTool team to help advance Google's Street View technology.

As part of Street View's development, 100 Toyota Priuses were purchased and outfitted with the Topcon box, digital mapping hardware developed by Levandowski's company 510 Systems.

In 2008, the Street View team launched project Ground Truth, to create accurate road maps by extracting data from satellites and street views. This laid the groundwork for the Google's self-driving car program.

Pribot 
In February 2008, a Discovery Channel producer for the documentary series Prototype This! called Levandowski. The producer requested to borrow Levandowski's Ghost Rider, the autonomous two-wheeled motocycle Levandowski's Berkeley team had built for the 2004 DARPA Grand Challenge. However, in 2007, Levandowski had donated the self-driving bike to the Smithsonian. Since the motorcycle was not available, Levandowski offered to retrofit a Toyota Prius as a self-driving pizza delivery car for the show.

As a Google employee, Levandowski asked Larry Page and Sebastian Thrun, if Google was interested in participating in the show. Both declined, citing liability issues. However, they authorized Levandowski to move forward with building the car, given it was clear that it was not associated with Google. Within weeks Levandowski founded Anthony's Robots so that he and his team could modify a Toyota Prius without reference to Google. He retrofitted the car with light detection and ranging technology (LiDAR), sensors, cameras, and software from his company 510 Systems and named the prototype, the Pribot. The Pribot was the first self-driving car to drive on public roads. The episode featuring Pribot driving itself and the pizza across the San Francisco Bay Bridge under police escort aired in December 2008.

After the broad press coverage of the Pribot, Levandowski and Thrun were greenlit to launch Google's self-driving car program in January 2009. In 2011, Google quietly acquired Levandowski's technology - the nucleus of Google's self-driving car project, via his two companies, 510 Systems, co-founded alongside Pierre-Yves Droz and Andrew Schultz, and Anthony's Robots for an estimated $20 million.

Project Chauffeur  
Project Chauffeur ran for almost two years undetected, road testing with seven vehicles before the New York Times revealed their existence on October 9, 2010. Google announced its self-driving car initiative via its blog later the same day.

Starting in 2010, lawmakers in various states expressed concerns over how to regulate the emerging technology. Nevada passed a law in June 2011 concerning the operation of autonomous cars in Nevada, which went into effect on March 1, 2012. Google had been lobbying for driverless car laws. A Toyota Prius modified with Google's experimental driverless technology was licensed by the Nevada Department of Motor Vehicles (DMV) in May 2012. The car was "driven" by Chris Urmson with Anthony Levandowski in the passengers seat. This was the first license issued in the United States for a self-driven car.

In late May 2014, Google revealed a new prototype of its driverless car, which had no steering wheel, gas pedal, or brake pedal, being 100% autonomous. In December, they unveiled a fully functioning prototype that they planned to test on San Francisco Bay Area roads beginning in early 2015. Called the Firefly, the car was intended to serve as a platform for experimentation and learning, not mass production.

In 2015, co-founder Anthony Levandowski left the project. In August 2015, Google hired former Hyundai Motor executive, John Krafcik, as CEO.  In fall 2015, Google provided "the world's first fully driverless ride on public roads" to a legally blind friend of principal engineer Nathaniel Fairfield. The ride was taken by Steve Mahan, former CEO of the Santa Clara Valley Blind Center, in Austin, Texas. It was the first entirely driverless drive on a public road. It was not accompanied by a test driver or police escort. The car had no steering wheel or floor pedals. By the end of 2015, Project Chauffeur had driven more than a million self-driven miles.

Waymo 
In December 2016, the project was renamed Waymo and became a new start-up company that is part of Alphabet. The name Waymo was derived from its mission, "a new way forward in mobility." Waymo underwent further test on its cars on public roads after its separation from Google.

In 2017, Waymo sued Uber for allegedly stealing trade secrets. A court document revealed Google had spent $1.1 billion on the project between 2009 and 2015. For comparison, the acquisition of Cruise Automation by General Motors in March 2016 was reported at just over $500 million, and Uber's acquisition of Otto in August 2016 was for $680 million. Waymo began testing autonomous minivans without a safety driver on public roads in Chandler, Arizona, in October 2017.

In April 2019, Waymo announced plans for vehicle assembly in Detroit at the former American Axle & Manufacturing plant, bringing between 100 and 400 jobs to the area. Waymo will use vehicle assembler Magna to turn Jaguar I-PACE and Chrysler Pacifica Hybrid minivans into Waymo Level 4 autonomous vehicles. Waymo subsequently decided to continue retrofitting existing car models rather than manufacturing a new design like the Firefly.

In March 2020, Waymo Via was launched after the company's announcement that it had raised $2.25 billion from a group of investors. In May 2020, Waymo raised an additional $750 million, bringing their total outside investment to $3 billion. In July 2020, the company announced an exclusive partnership with auto manufacturer Volvo to integrate Waymo's self-driving technology into Volvo's vehicles. In April 2021, John Krafcik stepped down as CEO and was replaced by two co-CEOs: Waymo's COO Tekedra Mawakana and CTO Dmitri Dolgov. Waymo raised $2.5 billion in a second funding round in June 2021, with a total funding of $5.5 billion.

In May 2022, Waymo launched its Waymo One Trusted Tester program for residents in Downtown Phoenix, Arizona, following internal testing with employees. The research-focused initiative asks participants to share feedback during their rides, similar to the program previously launched in San Francisco in August 2021. In May 2022, Waymo announced that it would be expanding the program to more areas of Phoenix. Plans to expand the program to Bellevue, Washington and Los Angeles were announced in late 2022.

In June 2022, Waymo announced a partnership with Uber, under which the former will integrate its autonomous technology into Uber's freight truck service. On December 13, 2022 Waymo applied for the final permit necessary to operate fully autonomous taxis, without a backup driver present, within the state of California.

In January 2023, The Information reported that Waymo staff were among those affected by Google's layoffs of around 12,000 workers. TechCrunch reported that Waymo is set to kill its trucking program.

Technology

In 2017, Waymo unveiled new sensors and chips that are less expensive to manufacture, cameras that improve visibility, and wipers to clear the lidar system. Waymo manufactures a suite of self-driving hardware developed in-house. These sensors and hardware-enhanced vision system, improved radar, and laser-based lidar—reduce Waymo's dependence on suppliers. The in-house production system allows Waymo to integrate its technology to the hardware efficiently. At the beginning of the self-driving car program, the company spent $75,000 for each lidar system from Velodyne. In 2017, the cost decreased approximately 90 percent, with Waymo designing its own version of lidar.

Waymo officials said the cars the company uses are built for full autonomy with sensors that give 360-degree views and lasers that detect objects up to 300 meters away. Short-range lasers detect and focus on objects near the vehicle, while radar is used to see around vehicles and track objects in motion. The interior of these cars includes buttons for riders to control certain functions: "help," "lock," "pull over," and "start ride."

Waymo engineers have also created a program called Carcraft, a virtual world where Waymo can simulate driving conditions. The simulator was named after the video game World of Warcraft. With Carcraft, 25,000 virtual self-driving cars navigate through models of Austin, Texas, Mountain View, California, Phoenix, Arizona, and other cities. , Waymo has driven more than 5 billion miles in the virtual world.

Waymo has created partnerships with Stellantis, Mercedes-Benz Group AG, Lyft, AutoNation, Avis, Intel, Jaguar Land Rover, and Volvo.

The Waymo project team has equipped various types of cars with the self-driving equipment, including the Toyota Prius, Audi TT, Fiat Chrysler Pacifica, and Lexus RX450h. Google also developed a custom vehicle, approximately 100 of which were assembled by Roush Enterprises with equipment from Bosch, ZF Lenksysteme, LG, and Continental.

In May 2016, Google and Stellantis announced an order of 100 Chrysler Pacifica hybrid minivans to test the self-driving technology. Waymo ordered an additional 500 Pacifica hybrids in 2017, and in late May 2018, Alphabet announced plans to add up to 62,000 Pacifica Hybrid minivans to the fleet. In March 2018, Jaguar Land Rover announced that Waymo had ordered up to 20,000 of its planned electric I-Pace cars at an estimated cost of more than $1 billion. Jaguar is to deliver the first I-Pace prototype later in the year, and the cars are to become part of Waymo's ride-hailing service in 2020.

Waymo partnered with Intel to use Intel technologies, such as processors, inside Waymo vehicles. It has deals with Avis and AutoNation for vehicle maintenance. With Lyft, Waymo is partnering on pilot projects and product development.

China's Geely Holding said its premium electric mobility brand, Zeekr, will make electric vehicles for Waymo, Alphabet Inc's self-driving unit, to be deployed as fully autonomous ride-hailing vehicles across the United States.

Road testing

Chronology 

In 2009, Google began testing its self-driving cars in the San Francisco Bay Area. Google's vehicles have traversed San Francisco's Lombard Street, famed for its steep hairpin turns, and through city traffic. The cars have driven over the Golden Gate Bridge and around Lake Tahoe. The system operates at the speed limit it has stored on its maps and maintains its distance from other vehicles using its system of sensors.

By December 2013, four U.S. states had passed laws permitting autonomous cars: Nevada, Florida, California, and Michigan. A law proposed in Texas would also allow testing of "autonomous motor vehicles".

In April 2014, the team announced that their vehicles had logged nearly 700,000 autonomous miles (1.1 million km). Google also announced its prototype vehicles were being road tested in Mountain View, California. During testing, the prototypes' speed did not exceed  and had safety drivers aboard. As a consequence, one of the vehicles was stopped by police for impeding traffic flow.

In 2015, Google expanded its road-testing to Texas, where regulations did not prohibit cars without pedals and a steering wheel. Bills were introduced by interested parties to similarly change the legislation in California.

Google took its first driverless ride on public roads in October 2015, when Mahan took a 10-minute solo ride around Austin in a Google "pod car" with no steering wheel or pedals. In 2016, the company expanded its road testing to the dry Phoenix, Arizona, area, and Kirkland, Washington, which has a wet climate. In May 2016, the company opened a 53,000 square foot self-driving technology development center in Novi, Michigan. In August 2016 alone, their cars traveled a "total of 170,000 miles; of those, 126,000 miles were autonomous (i.e., the car was fully in control)".

Beginning of 2017, Waymo reported to California DMV a total of 636,868 miles covered by the fleet in autonomous mode, and the associated 124 disengagements, for the period from December 1, 2015, through November 30, 2016.

In November 2017, Waymo altered its Arizona testing by removing safety drivers in the driver position from their autonomous Chrysler Pacificas. The cars were geofenced within a 100 square mile region surrounding Chandler, Arizona. Waymo's early rider program members were the first to take rides using the new technology.

Waymo began testing its level 4 autonomous cars in Arizona for several reasons: good weather, simple roads, and reasonable autonomous vehicle laws. Users hail vehicles through the Waymo app. They also have access to an onboard support system that can connect riders to a Waymo agent. In 2017, Waymo began weather testing in Michigan. Also, in 2017, Waymo unveiled its test facility, Castle, on 91 acres in Central Valley, California. Castle, a former airbase, has served as the project's training course since 2012.

According to a Waymo report, as of March 2018, Waymo's self-driving technology had driven more than 5 million miles on public roads and more than 5 billion miles via simulation. Waymo's 25,000 virtual self-driving cars travel 8 million miles per day. By October 2018, Waymo had completed 10 million miles of driving on public roads and over 7 billion simulation miles, and by January 2020, 20 million miles of driving on public roads had been completed.

By 2018, Waymo had tested its system in six states and 25 cities across the U.S over a span of nine years. In March 2018, Waymo announced its plans to build additional real-world self-driving experiments with the company's self-driving trucks delivering for sister company Google's data centers located in Atlanta, Georgia.

, Waymo was waiting for permits to test the cars in California, hoping to test in Los Altos, Mountain View, Palo Alto, and Sunnyvale. On October 30, 2018, the California Department of Motor Vehicles issued a permit for Waymo to operate fully driverless cars (i.e., cars without human safety drivers). Waymo was the first company to receive a permit, that allows day and night testing on public roads and highways in California. In a blog post, Waymo announced that its fully driverless cars would be restricted to Mountain View, Sunnyvale, Los Altos, and Palo Alto — all communities close to parent company Alphabet's headquarters (Googleplex). In July 2019, Waymo was permitted by California regulators to transport passengers in its vehicles.

In December 2018, Waymo launched the commercial self-driving car service called "Waymo One", allowing users in the Phoenix metropolitan area to use an app and request a pick-up. The service uses safety backup drivers who monitor the rides, with a smaller percentage of rides being provided in select areas by fully driverless vehicles. In November 2019, Waymo One was the first autonomous service worldwide operating without any safety drivers in the car. The service was paused in March 2020 due to the COVID-19 pandemic, with a limited service restarted in June 2020. In September 2020, Waymo announced it had partnered with fellow Alphabet company Verily to provide COVID-19 testing to its front-line employees and partners.

In 2021, Waymo expanded testing of Waymo One to San Francisco. In February 2021 the company started limited rider testing in San Francisco with Waymo employee volunteers.
In August 2021, commercial Waymo One test service started in the city, beginning with a "trusted tester" rollout.

In March 2022, Waymo said that they will begin offering rides in San Francisco without a driver. The driverless rides will be available only for Waymo staff to start.

Crashes 
In June 2015, Google confirmed the occurrence of 12 collisions. By July 2015, Google's 23 self-driving cars have been involved in 14 minor collisions on public roads. On February 14, 2016, while creeping forward to a stoplight, a Google self-driving car attempted to avoid sandbags blocking its path. During the maneuver, it struck the side of a bus. Google addressed the crash, saying, "In this case, we clearly bear some responsibility because if our car hadn't moved there wouldn't have been a collision." Some incomplete video footage of the crash is available. Google characterized the crash as a misunderstanding and a learning experience. The company also stated, "This type of misunderstanding happens between human drivers on the road every day." Google maintained that, in all cases other than the February 2016 incident, the vehicle itself was not at fault because the cars were either being manually driven or the driver of another vehicle was at fault.

Google initially maintained monthly reports that include any traffic incidents that its self-driving cars had been involved in. Waymo now publishes its own safety reports.

Waymo and other companies are required by the California DMV to report the number of incidents during testing where the human driver took control for safety reasons. Some of these incidents were not reported by Google when simulations indicated the car would have stopped on its own. There is some controversy concerning this distinction between driver-initiated disengagements that Google reports and those that it does not report.

Limitations 
Waymo operates in some of its testing markets, such as Chandler, Arizona, at level 4 autonomy with no one sitting behind the steering wheel, sharing roadways with other drivers and pedestrians. However, more testing is needed. Waymo's earlier testing has focused on areas without harsh weather, extreme density, or complicated road systems, but it has moved on to test under new conditions. As a result, Waymo has begun testing in areas with harsher conditions, such as its winter testing in Michigan.

In 2014, a critic wrote in the MIT Technology Review that unmapped stop lights would cause problems with Waymo's technology and the self-driving technology could not detect potholes. Additionally, the lidar technology cannot spot some potholes or discern when humans, such as a police officers, signal the car to stop, the critic wrote. Waymo has worked to improve how its technology responds in construction zones.

Commercialization
In 2012, Brin stated that Google Self-Driving cars would be available for the general public in 2017. In 2014, this schedule was updated by project director Chris Urmson to indicate a possible release from 2017 to 2020.

In December 2016, Waymo CEO John Krafcik stated in a blog post, "We can see our technology being useful in personal vehicles, ridesharing, logistics, or solving last mile problems for public transport. Our next step as Waymo will be to let people use our vehicles to do everyday things like run errands, commute to work, or get safely home after a night on the town." Temporary use of vehicles is known as Transportation as a Service (TaaS).

Waymo highlighted four specific business uses for its autonomous tech in 2017: Ridesharing, users can hail cars equipped with Waymo technology via transportation network company apps; trucking and logistics, urban last-mile solutions for public transportation, and passenger cars. In 2017, Waymo was also considering licensing autonomous technology to vehicle manufacturers.

In May 2018, Waymo established a subsidiary in Shanghai, Huimo Business Consulting, with $441,000 of funding.

In April 2021, Waymo's co-CEOs Dmitri Dolgov and Tekedra Mawakana stated that the company will continue with a safety-conscious roadmap to robotic ride-hailing, trucks and personal vehicles, even though it may take a longer time to reach commercialization.

Robotaxis 
In August 2013, news reports surfaced about robotaxi, a proposed driverless vehicle taxicab service from Google. These reports re-appeared again in early 2014, following the granting of a patent to Google for an advertising fee funded transportation service which included autonomous vehicles as a transport method. Google consultant Larry Burns says self-driving, taxi-like vehicles "should be viewed as a new form of public transportation".

In April 2017, Waymo launched an early rider program in Phoenix, Arizona, which signed up 400 users to try out a test edition of Waymo's transportation service. Over the next year, 400 riders used the Waymo service, providing feedback. In May 2018, Waymo announced that it planned to allow everyone in Phoenix to request a driverless ride before the end of the year. On December 5, 2018, the company launched a commercial self-driving car service called "Waymo One"; users in the Phoenix metropolitan area use an app to request a pick-up. By November 2019, the service was operating autonomous vehicles without a safety backup driver, the first autonomous service worldwide operating without safety drivers in the car. In 2021, the company started public testing in San Francisco.

In October 2022, Waymo announced their plans to launch a robotaxi service in Los Angeles, California. On November 18, 2022, Waymo announced it will begin no-driver taxi services in San Francisco, California after the California Public Utilities Commission granted it a permit.

Trucking and delivery 
"Waymo Via" is the trucking division of Waymo, which launched in March 2020. Using the same sensors and software as Waymo's other autonomous vehicles, Class 8 tractor-trailers began testing Waymo's self-driving technology in California and Arizona in 2017. In 2018, Waymo launched a pilot program with Google to use autonomous trucks to move freight to its sister company's Atlanta-area data centers. According to a Transport Topics news article, "Waymo does not intend to get into truck manufacturing or shipping services. Instead, it wants to work with OEMs and motor carriers to get its technology into vehicles." In October 2019, CEO John Krafcik stated that Waymo was fleshing out the trucking side of the business, and that self-driving commercial business vehicles might catch on faster than the ride-hailing robotaxi service. In June 2020, Waymo announced its plans to focus testing efforts on southwest shipping routes including, Texas, New Mexico, Arizona and California. In August 2020 the company added a new trucking hub in Dallas, Texas, to test their fleet of Peterbilt trucks in various commercial settings. In October 2020, Waymo announced a global strategic partnership with Mercedes-Benz AG to integrate Waymo's driver technology into a fleet of Freightliner Cascadia semi-trailer trucks.

Waymo has also expanded the use of their self-driving technology to commercial delivery vehicles. In January 2020 the company announced a pilot program with United Parcel Service, where Waymo vehicles transfer packages from UPS stores to a UPS sorting facility. This process allows packages at the UPS stores to be moved more rapidly into the UPS delivery system, instead of waiting to pick them up at the end of the day. In July 2020 Waymo and Stellantis announced an expansion of their partnership, including the development of level 4 autonomous Ram ProMaster delivery vehicles.

Legal issues

Waymo LLC v. Uber Technologies, Inc. et al. 
In February 2017, Waymo sued Uber and its subsidiary self-driving trucking company, Otto, with allegations of stealing trade secrets and infringing on patents. The company claimed that three ex-Google employees, including Anthony Levandowski, had stolen trade secrets, including thousands of driverless car technology files, from Google before joining Uber. The infringement is related to Waymo's proprietary lidar technology, which could measure the distances between objects using laser and create their three-dimensional representations. Google accused Uber of colluding with Levandowski to obtain information about its lidar and other technologies in its driverless car project. The former Google engineer downloaded 9 gigabytes of data that included over a hundred trade secrets; eight were at stake during the trial.

The trial began on February 5, 2018, and concluded on February 9, as a settlement was announced with Uber giving Waymo 0.34 percent of Uber's stock, the equivalent of $245 million in Uber equity and agreeing to ensure Uber does not infringe Waymo's intellectual property. Part of the agreement included a guarantee that "Waymo confidential information is not being incorporated in Uber Advanced Technologies Group hardware and software." In released statements after the settlement, Uber maintained that it received no trade secrets. In May, according to the statement from Matt Kallman, an Uber spokesman, Uber had fired Levandowski, which resulted in a loss of roughly $250 million of his own equity in Uber and this value almost exactly equaled to the stock value Uber paid to Waymo LLC. Uber announced that it was halting production of self-driving through trucks through Otto in July 2018, and the subsidiary company was shuttered.

California DMV safety disclosure dispute 
In January 2022, Waymo sued the California Department of Motor Vehicles (DMV) to prevent data on driverless crashes from being made public. Waymo maintained that such information constituted a trade secret. According to The Los Angeles Times, the "topics Waymo wants to keep hidden include how it plans to handle driverless car emergencies, what it would do if a robot taxi started driving itself where it wasn’t supposed to go, and what constraints there are on the car’s ability to traverse San Francisco’s tunnels, tight curves and steep hills."

In February 2022, Waymo was successful in preventing the release of certain robotaxi safety records to the public. Following the conclusion of the case, a spokesperson for Waymo affirmed that the company will be transparent with the public about its safety record.

References

Further reading

External links

 
 
 Scalability in Perception for Autonomous Driving: Waymo Open Dataset
 Waymo Self Driving Car Videos - citizen journalist recording Waymo autonomous trips in Phoenix area

 
Alphabet Inc.
Self-driving car companies
Electric vehicles
Google